"Say Hello" was released in the United Kingdom and Europe on 3 September 1990, as Breathe's first single from the album Peace of Mind, and twelfth overall. It was not issued as a single in the United States by A&M Records, which had issued "Say A Prayer" the previous month as the album’s first single. 

The song was written by David Glasper and Francis 'Eg' White.

The B-side song "All That Jazz" was the title track from the band's first album, and had previously been released as a UK-only single in August 1987.

"Say Hello" peaked at No. 87 on the UK Singles Chart.

Track listings 
UK 7" single (SIREN SRN131)

A. "Say Hello" - 3:52

B. "All That Jazz" - 4:07

The 7" single was available in a limited-edition box containing three personality portraits (SRNB131)

UK 12" single (SIREN SRNT131)

A1. "Say Hello" - 3:52

A2. "All That Jazz" - 4:07

B1. "Say Hello (Again)" - 4:55

B2. "Hands To Heaven [Remix]" - 4:18

UK CD single (SIREN SRNCD 131)

1. "Say Hello" - 3:52

2. "Say Hello (Again)" - 4:55

3. "All That Jazz" - 4:07

4. "Hands to Heaven [Remix]" - 4:18 

The Limited edition CD single included a bonus set of three band members portraits housed inside a slim video style box with picture insert.

All songs written by David Glasper and Marcus Lillington, except "Say Hello" written by David Glasper and Francis White. All songs published by BMG VM Music Limited, except "Say Hello" published by BMG Gold Songs/Kobalt Songs Music Publishing.

Personnel

Band 

 David Glasper (vocals)
 Marcus Lillington (guitar, keyboards, programming)
 Ian Spice (drums)
 Michael Delahunty (bass guitar) on “All That Jazz” & “Hands To Heaven”.

Production 

 Engineer: John Gallen (“Say Hello”), Chris Porter (“All That Jazz”); John Madden (“Hands To Heaven”).
 Mastered By: Ian Cooper
 Mixed By: Julian Mendelsohn (“Say Hello”), Chris Porter (“Hands To Heaven”)
Producer: Chris Porter ("All That Jazz")
Remixing: Julian Mendelsohn (“Say Hello (Again)”); Chris Porter (“Hands To Heaven”); Bob Kraushaar (“All That Jazz”).
 A&R: Simon Hicks
 Art Direction, Design: John Warwicker, Vivid I.D.
 Management: Jonny Too Bad, Paul King
 Photography: Martin Brading

David Glasper (vocals), Marcus Lillington (guitar), and Ian “Spike” Spice (drums). Michael “Mick” Delahunty (bass guitar) on “All That Jazz” & “Hands To Heaven”.

Charts

References

External links 

 

1990 songs
1990 singles
Breathe (British band) songs
Song recordings produced by Bob Sargeant
Virgin Records singles
Songs written by Eg White